Pablo Ignacio Corral Mondaca (born January 16, 1992) is a Chilean footballer who plays for Santiago Wanderers as a midfielder.

Honours

Club
Universidad Católica
 Copa Chile: 2011

Deportes Puerto Montt
 Segunda División Profesional:

External links
 

1992 births
Living people
Footballers from Santiago
Chilean footballers
Club Deportivo Universidad Católica footballers
Deportes La Serena footballers
Puerto Montt footballers
Naval de Talcahuano footballers
San Marcos de Arica footballers
C.D. Antofagasta footballers
Deportes Iquique footballers
Curicó Unido footballers
Santiago Wanderers footballers
Chilean Primera División players
Segunda División Profesional de Chile players
Primera B de Chile players
Association football midfielders